David Dunwiddie (September 17, 1823 – December 19, 1896) was a member of the Wisconsin State Assembly.

Biography
Dunwiddie was born in Greene County, Ohio in 1823. In 1845, he moved to what is now Green County, Wisconsin, where he became a farmer. He later settled in Brodhead, Wisconsin.

Dunwiddie married Cynthia Mitchell. They had five children. A son, Benjamin Franklin Dunwiddie, became a judge of the Wisconsin Circuit Court.

Political career
Dunwiddie was a member of the Green County board of supervisors in 1860, where he served on the committees for the county poor and for justice and constable claims. Dunwiddie was a member of the Assembly during the 1865 and 1867 sessions. As a Republican, he was affiliated with the National Union Party.

References

External links

People from Greene County, Ohio
People from Brodhead, Wisconsin
Republican Party members of the Wisconsin State Assembly
Farmers from Wisconsin
1823 births
1896 deaths
19th-century American politicians